Kemestaródfa is a village in Vas county, Hungary. It is located near the western border of the country.

References

Populated places in Vas County